Sagardighi Kamada Kinkar Smriti Mahavidyalaya is a general degree college at Sagardighi, Murshidabad district in the state of West Bengal. It offers undergraduate courses in arts. It is affiliated to  University of Kalyani.

Departments

Science
Math General
Physics General
Chemistry General

Arts
Bengali
English
Sanskrit
Arabic
History
Geography
Political Science
Philosophy
Education

See also

References

External links
Sagardighi Kamada Kinkar Smriti Mahavidyalaya
University of Kalyani
University Grants Commission
National Assessment and Accreditation Council

Colleges affiliated to University of Kalyani
Universities and colleges in Murshidabad district
Educational institutions in India with year of establishment missing